Chan Hao-ching and Latisha Chan were the defending champions, but Latisha Chan chose not to participate this year. Chan Hao-ching played alongside Tímea Babos, but lost in the semifinals to Nao Hibino and Oksana Kalashnikova.

Duan Yingying and Wang Yafan won the title, defeating Hibino and Kalashnikova in the final, 7–6(7–4), 7–6(7–5).

Seeds

Draw

Draw

References
Main Draw

Taiwan Open - Doubles
WTA Taiwan Open